AFT may refer to:

 Aft, towards the stern (rear) of the ship in nautical terminology
 AFT (album), a 1978 album by Joanne Brackeen 
 Accelerated failure time model, a statistical term 
 Afitti language, ISO 939-3 language code aft
 AFT UAV, a Chinese company
 Afghanistan Time, UTC + 04:30
 American Farmland Trust
 American Federation of Teachers
 American Folklore Theatre
 Amniotic fluid test, a medical term
 Applied Food Technologies
 Automatic fine tuning, a radio term
 Autonomous flight termination , a term in rocketry

See also
 Afternoon
 Americans For Fair Taxation (AFFT)